Lieutenant Colonel Thibaut Vallette (born 18 January 1974) is a French equestrian. He represented his country at the 2016 Summer Olympics, where he won the gold medal in the team eventing. He was a career officer in the Alpine Troops (Chasseurs Alpins) before being seconded to the Cadre Noir at Saumur.

Vallette also participated at the 2015 European Eventing Championships held at Blair Castle, where he won bronze medals in both team and individual eventing.

CCI 5* Results

International Championship Results

References 

1974 births
Living people
French male equestrians
Equestrians at the 2016 Summer Olympics
Olympic equestrians of France
Olympic gold medalists for France
Olympic medalists in equestrian
Medalists at the 2016 Summer Olympics